Ellery Queen is a pseudonym created in 1929 by American crime fiction writers Frederic Dannay and Manfred Bennington Lee and the name of their main fictional character, a mystery writer in New York City who helps his police inspector father solve baffling murders. Dannay and Lee wrote most of the more than thirty novels and several short story collections in which Ellery Queen appeared as a character, and their books were among the most popular of American mysteries published between 1929 and 1971. In addition to the fiction featuring their eponymous brilliant amateur detective, the two men acted as editors: as Ellery Queen they edited more than thirty anthologies of crime fiction and true crime, and Dannay founded and for many decades edited Ellery Queen's Mystery Magazine, which has been published continuously from 1941 to the present. From 1961, Dannay and Lee also commissioned other authors to write crime thrillers using the Ellery Queen nom de plume, but not featuring Ellery Queen as a character; several juvenile novels were credited to Ellery Queen, Jr. Finally, the prolific duo wrote four mysteries under the pseudonym Barnaby Ross.

Adding another layer of complexity to their relations, the two men were cousins, who created the nom de plume Ellery Queen using their professional names. Frederic Dannay was the professional name of Daniel Nathan (October 20, 1905 – September 3, 1982), and Manfred Bennington Lee that of Emanuel Benjamin Lepofsky (January 11, 1905 – April 3, 1971).

Career of Dannay and Lee

In a successful series of novels and short stories that covered 42 years, "Ellery Queen" served as a joint pseudonym for the cousins Dannay and Lee, as well as the name of the primary detective-hero they created. During the 1930s and much of the 1940s, that detective-hero was possibly the best known American fictional detective. Movies, radio shows, and television shows were based on Dannay and Lee's works.

Frederic Dannay, without much involvement from Lee, was founding and directing editor of Ellery Queen's Mystery Magazine, a crime fiction magazine. They were also prominent historians in the field, editing numerous collections and anthologies of short stories such as The Misadventures of Sherlock Holmes. Their 994-page anthology for the Modern Library, 101 Years' Entertainment: The Great Detective Stories, 1841–1941, was a landmark work that remained in print for many years. Under their collective pseudonym, the cousins were given the Grand Master Award for achievements in the field of the mystery story by the Mystery Writers of America in 1961.

The fictional Ellery Queen was the hero of more than 30 novels and several short story collections, written by Dannay and Lee and published under the Ellery Queen pseudonym. Dannay and Lee also wrote four novels about a detective named Drury Lane using the pseudonym Barnaby Ross. They allowed the Ellery Queen name to be used as a house name for a number of novels written by other authors from outlines provided by Dannay, most of them published in the 1960s as paperback originals and not featuring Ellery Queen as a character.

Dannay and Lee remained circumspect about their writing methods. Novelist and critic H.R.F. Keating wrote, "How actually did they do it? Did they sit together and hammer the stuff out word by word? Did one write the dialogue and the other the narration? ... What eventually happened was that Fred Dannay, in principle, produced the plots, the clues, and what would have to be deduced from them as well as the outlines of the characters and Manfred Lee clothed it all in words. But it is unlikely to have been as clear cut as that."

According to critic Otto Penzler, "As an anthologist, Ellery Queen is without peer, his taste unequalled. As a bibliographer and a collector of the detective short story, Queen is, again, a historical personage. Indeed, Ellery Queen clearly is, after Poe, the most important American in mystery fiction." British crime novelist Margery Allingham wrote that Ellery Queen had "done far more for the detective story than any other two men put together".

Although Frederic Dannay outlived his cousin by eleven years, the Ellery Queen authorial name died with Manfred Lee. The last novel featuring the character Ellery Queen, A Fine and Private Place, was published in 1971, the year of Lee's death. However, Ellery Queen's Mystery Magazine, now published by Dell Magazines, continues as a crime fiction magazine as of 2020, currently publishing six "double issues" per year.

Ellery Queen, the fictional character
Ellery Queen was created in 1928 when Dannay and Lee entered a writing contest sponsored by McClure's magazine for the best first mystery novel. They decided to use as their collective pseudonym the same name that they had given their detective. Inspired by the formula and style of the Philo Vance novels by S.S. Van Dine, their entry won the contest, but before it could be published, the magazine closed. Undeterred, the cousins took their novel to other publishers, and The Roman Hat Mystery was published in 1929. According to H.R.F. Keating, "Later the cousins took a sharper view of the Philo Vance character, Manfred Lee calling him, with typical vehemence, 'the biggest prig that ever came down the pike'."

The Roman Hat Mystery established a reliable template: a geographic formula title (The Dutch Shoe Mystery, The Egyptian Cross Mystery, etc.); an unusual crime; a complex series of clues and red herrings; multiple misdirected solutions before the final truth is revealed, and a cast of supporting characters including Ellery's father, Inspector Richard Queen, and his irascible assistant, Sergeant Velie. What became the best known part of the early Ellery Queen books was the "Challenge to the Reader". This was a single page near the end of the book declaring that the reader had seen all the same clues Ellery had, and that only one solution was possible. According to the novelist and critic Julian Symons, "The rare distinction of the books is that this claim is accurate. There are problems in deduction that do really permit of only one answer, and there are few crime stories indeed of which this can be said."

The fictional detective Ellery Queen is the author of the books in which he appears (The Finishing Stroke, 1958) and the editor of the magazine that bears his name (The Player on the Other Side, 1963). As Van Dine had done earlier with Philo Vance, the creators of the Queen character gave him an extremely elaborate back story that was rarely mentioned after the first few novels. In fact, Queen goes through several transformations in his personality and his approach to investigation over the course of the series.

In the earlier novels, Queen is a snobbish Harvard-educated intellectual of independent means who wears pince-nez glasses and investigates crimes because he finds them stimulating. He supposedly derived these characteristics from his late mother, the daughter of an aristocratic New York family who had married Richard Queen, a bluff, man-in-the-street New York Irishman. From 1938, Ellery spends some time working in Hollywood as a screenwriter (in The Four of Hearts and The Origin of Evil) and solves cases with a Hollywood setting. At this point, he has a slick façade, is part of Hollywood society and hobnobs comfortably with the wealthy and famous. Beginning with Calamity Town in 1942, Ellery becomes less of a cypher and more of a human being, often becoming emotionally affected by the people in his cases, and at one point quitting detective work altogether. Calamity Town, two sequels, and some short stories are set in the imaginary town of Wrightsville, and subsidiary characters recur from story to story; Ellery relates to the various strata of American society as an outsider. However, after his Hollywood and Wrightsville periods, he is returned to his New York City roots for the remainder of his career, and is then seen again as an ultra-logical crime solver who remains distant from his cases. In the very late novels, he often seems a near-faceless, near-characterless persona whose role is purely to solve the mystery. So striking are the differences between the different periods of the Ellery Queen character that Julian Symons advanced the theory that there were two "Ellery Queens" — an older and younger brother.

Ellery Queen is said to be married and the father of a child in the introductions to the first few novels, but this plot line is never developed and Ellery is mainly portrayed as a bachelor. The character of Nikki Porter, who acts as Ellery's secretary and is something of a love interest, was encountered first in the radio series. Nikki's curiosity and her attempts to encourage Ellery to work as a detective are responsible for a number of radio and film plots from the early 1940s. Her first appearance in a written story is in the final pages of There Was an old Woman (1943), when a character with whom Ellery has had some flirtatious moments announces spontaneously that she's changing her name to Nikki Porter and going to work as Ellery's secretary. Nikki Porter appears sporadically thereafter in novels and stories, linking the character from radio and movies into the written canon. The character of Paula Paris, an agoraphobic gossip columnist, is linked romantically with Ellery in one novel, The Four of Hearts, and in short stories during the Hollywood period, but does not appear in the radio series or films, and soon vanished from the books. Ellery is not given any serious romantic interests after Nikki Porter and Paula Paris disappear from the books. Late in the series, in the 1968 novel The House of Brass, Inspector Queen remarries after decades as a widower.

The Queen household, an apartment on West 87th street in New York City shared by the Queens, father and son, also contains a houseboy named Djuna, at least in the earliest novels and short stories. This young man, who may be of Roma origin, appears periodically in the canon, apparently ageless and family-free, in a supporting role as cook, receiver of parcels, valet, and occasional minor comedy relief.  He is the principal character in some, but not all, of the juvenile novels ghost-written by other writers under the pseudonym Ellery Queen, Jr.

Fictional style
The Queen novels are examples of the classic "fair play" whodunit mystery, and are textbook examples of what became known as the Golden age of detective fiction. Because the reader obtains clues in the same way as the protagonist detective, the book becomes an intellectually challenging puzzle. Mystery writer John Dickson Carr termed it "the grandest game in the world".

The early Queen novels were characterized by intricately plotted clues and solutions. In The Greek Coffin Mystery (1932), The Siamese Twin Mystery, and others, multiple solutions to the mystery are proposed, a feature that also showed up in later books such as Double, Double and Ten Days' Wonder. Queen's "false solution, followed by the truth" became a hallmark of the canon. Another stylistic element in many early books (notably The Dutch Shoe Mystery, The French Powder Mystery and Halfway House) is Ellery's method of creating a list of attributes (the murderer is male, the murderer smokes a pipe, etc.). Then, by comparing each suspect to these attributes, he reduces the list of suspects to a single name, often an unlikely one.

By the late 1930s, when Ellery Queen—author and character—moved to Hollywood to try movie scriptwriting, the tone of the novels began to change along with the detective's character. Romance was introduced, solutions began to involve more psychological elements, and the "Challenge to the Reader" vanished from the books. Some of the novels also moved from mere puzzles to more introspective themes. The three novels set in the fictional New England town of Wrightsville, starting with Calamity Town in 1942, even showed the limitations of Ellery's methods of detection. According to Julian Symons, "Ellery ... occasionally lost his father, as his exploits took place more frequently in the small town of Wrightsville ... where his arrival as a house guest was likely to be the signal for the commission of one or more murders. Very intelligently, Dannay and Lee used this change in locale to loosen the structure of their stories. More emphasis was placed on personal relationships and less on the details of investigation."

In the 1950s and 1960s, the authors tried some more experimental work, especially in three novels written by other writers, all based on detailed outlines by Dannay. The Player on the Other Side, ghost-written by Theodore Sturgeon, delves more deeply into motive than most Ellery Queen novels. And on the Eighth Day (1964), ghost-written by Avram Davidson, was a religious allegory touching on fascism. Davidson also wrote The Fourth Side of the Triangle.

Toward the end of their careers, the cousins allowed some crime novels, mainly paperback originals, to be written by ghostwriters as part of the Ellery Queen franchise. These books did not feature the character Ellery Queen as the protagonist. They included three novels featuring "the governor's troubleshooter", Micah "Mike" McCall, and six featuring Captain Tim Corrigan, of the NYPD's Main Office Squad. The prominent science-fiction writer Jack Vance wrote three of these original paperbacks, including the locked room mystery A Room to Die In.

There are also several collections of Ellery Queen short stories. These were praised by Julian Symons as follows: "[I]n some ways the short story is better suited than the novel to this kind of writing... This is notable especially in the case of Ellery Queen. The best of his short stories belong to the early intensely ratiocinative period, and both The Adventures of Ellery Queen (1934) and The New Adventures (1940) are as absolutely fair and totally puzzling as the most passionate devotee of orthodoxy could wish... (E)very story in these books is composed with wonderful skill."

Novels as Barnaby Ross
Beginning in 1932, the cousins wrote four novels using the pseudonym Barnaby Ross about Drury Lane, a Shakespearean actor who had retired from the stage due to deafness and was consulted as an amateur detective. The novels also featured Inspector Thumm (at first of the New York police, then later a private investigator) and his crime-solving daughter Patience. The Drury Lane novels are in the whodunit style. The Tragedy of X and The Tragedy of Y are variations on the locked-room mystery format.  The Tragedy of Y bears some resemblance to the later Ellery Queen novel There Was an Old Woman: both are about eccentric families headed by a matriarch.

In the early 1930s, before Dannay and Lee's identity as the authors had been made public, "Ellery Queen" and "Barnaby Ross" staged a series of public debates in which one cousin impersonated Queen and the other impersonated Ross, both of them wearing masks to preserve their anonymity. According to H.R.F. Keating, "People said Ross must be the wit and critic Alexander Woollcott and Queen S.S. Van Dine..., creator of the super-snob detective Philo Vance, on whom 'Ellery Queen' was indeed modeled."

In the 1960s, the cousins allowed the Barnaby Ross name to be used as a pseudonym for the publication of a series of historical romance novels by Don Tracy.  From the 1940s, republications of the Drury Lane books were mostly under the Ellery Queen name.

The first Ellery Queen novel The Roman Hat Mystery refers to "the now ancient Barnaby Ross murder case."

In other media

Radio
On radio, The Adventures of Ellery Queen was heard on all three networks from 1939 to 1948. During the 1970s, syndicated radio fillers, Ellery Queen's Minute Mysteries, began with an announcer saying, "This is Ellery Queen..." and contained a short one-minute case. The radio station encouraged callers to solve the mystery and win a sponsor's prize. Once a winner was found, the solution was broadcast as confirmation. A complete episode guide and history of this radio program can be found in the book The Sound of Detection: Ellery Queen's Adventures in Radio, published by OTR Publishing in 2002. The Adventure of the Murdered Moths (Crippen & Landru, 2005) is the first book edition of many of the radio scripts.

Television

Helene Hanff, best known for her book 84, Charing Cross Road, was a script writer for the television series version of The Adventures of Ellery Queen (1950–1952), which began on the DuMont Television Network but soon moved (in 1951) to ABC. Shortly after the series began, Richard Hart, who played Queen, died and was replaced in the lead role by Lee Bowman. The series returned to DuMont in 1954 with Hugh Marlowe (who had played the role on the radio series) as the title character. George Nader played Queen in The Further Adventures of Ellery Queen (1958–1959), but he was replaced with Lee Philips in the final episodes.

Peter Lawford starred in a television film, Ellery Queen: Don't Look Behind You, in 1971. Veteran actor Harry Morgan played Inspector Queen, but in this film he was described as Ellery's uncle (perhaps to account for the fact that Morgan was only eight years Lawford's senior, or for Lawford's English accent). This film is loosely based on Cat of Many Tails.

The 1975 television movie Ellery Queen (a.k.a. "Too Many Suspects"—a loose adaptation of The Fourth Side of the Triangle) led to the 1975–1976 television series starring Jim Hutton in the title role (with David Wayne as his widowed father). The series was done as a period piece set in New York City in 1946–1947. Sergeant Velie, Inspector Queen's assistant, was a cast regular in this series; he had appeared in the novels and the radio series, but had not been seen regularly in any of the previous television versions. Each episode contained a "Challenge to the Viewer" with Ellery breaking the fourth wall to go over the facts of the case and invite the audience to solve the mystery on their own, immediately before the solution was revealed. Each episode of the 1975 television series featured a number of Hollywood celebrities. Eve Arden, George Burns, Joan Collins, Roddy McDowall, Milton Berle, Guy Lombardo, Rudy Vallée, and Don Ameche were among the guests. Richard Levinson and William Link, the creators of the series had won a Special Edgars Award for creating the Columbo and Ellery Queen TV series.

In 2011, in the Leverage episode "The 10 Li'l Grifters Job", Timothy Hutton's character Nate Ford appears at a costumed murder mystery party as Ellery Queen, in a homage to the actor's late father, Jim.

Films
The Spanish Cape Mystery (1935) Donald Cook as Ellery Queen, Guy Usher as Inspector Queen (based on The Spanish Cape Mystery)
The Mandarin Mystery (1936) Eddie Quillan as Ellery Queen, Wade Boteler as Inspector Queen (loosely based on The Chinese Orange Mystery); this film is now in the public domain
Ellery Queen, Master Detective (1940) Ralph Bellamy as Ellery Queen, Margaret Lindsay as Nikki Porter, Charley Grapewin as Inspector Queen (very loosely based on The Door Between)
Ellery Queen's Penthouse Mystery (1941) Ralph Bellamy as Ellery Queen, Margaret Lindsay as Nikki Porter, Charley Grapewin as Inspector Queen
Ellery Queen and the Perfect Crime (1941) Ralph Bellamy as Ellery Queen, Margaret Lindsay as Nikki Porter, Charley Grapewin as Inspector Queen (loosely based on The Devil To Pay)
Ellery Queen and the Murder Ring (1941) Ralph Bellamy as Ellery Queen, Margaret Lindsay as Nikki Porter, Charley Grapewin as Inspector Queen (loosely based on The Dutch Shoe Mystery)
A Close Call for Ellery Queen (1942) William Gargan as Ellery Queen, Margaret Lindsay as Nikki Porter, Charley Grapewin as Inspector Queen
A Desperate Chance for Ellery Queen (1942) William Gargan as Ellery Queen, Margaret Lindsay as Nikki Porter, Charley Grapewin as Inspector Queen
Enemy Agents Meet Ellery Queen (1942) William Gargan as Ellery Queen, Margaret Lindsay as Nikki Porter, Charley Grapewin as Inspector Queen
La Décade prodigieuse (1971) (English title, Ten Days' Wonder) directed by Claude Chabrol and starring Anthony Perkins, Orson Welles. There is no character named Ellery Queen but Michel Piccoli plays "Paul Regis", the investigator. (Based on Ten Days' Wonder.)
Haitatsu sarenai santsu no tegami (1979) (English title, The Three Undelivered Letters) a Japanese movie directed by Yoshitarō Nomura (based on Calamity Town but apparently not containing Ellery Queen or any detective character).

Comic books and graphic novels

Ellery Queen stories appeared in issues of Crackajack Funnies beginning in 1940, a four issue series by Superior Comics in 1949, two issues of a short-lived series by Ziff Davis in 1952, and three comics published by Dell in 1962. Mike W. Barr used Ellery as a guest star in an issue of his Maze Agency #9 in February 1990, published by Innovation Comics, in a story titled "The English Channeler Mystery: A Problem in Deduction."
Queen (the character) is highlighted in volume 11 of Detective Conan manga's edition of "Gosho Aoyoma's Mystery Library", a section of the graphic novels where the author introduces a different detective (or occasionally, a villain) from mystery literature, television, or other media. The character Heiji Hattori also mentioned that he prefers Ellery Queen to Arthur Conan Doyle in volume 12.

Board games and jigsaw puzzles
The name of Ellery Queen was attached to a number of games, including 1956's (Ellery Queen's Great Mystery Game) Trapped, 1967's The Case of the Elusive Assassin by Ellery Queen, a jigsaw puzzle in 1973 called "Ellery Queen: The Case of His Headless Highness" and a board game in 1986 called "Ellery Queen's Mystery Magazine Game".  There is also a VCR-based game from the early 1980s called "Ellery Queen's Operation: Murder" (loosely based on The Dutch Shoe Mystery).

Theater
Dannay and Lee, in collaboration with playwright Lowell Brentano, wrote the play Danger, Men Working. The production never made it to Broadway, closing after a few performances in Baltimore and Philadelphia in 1936.

In 1949 William Roos (writing as William Rand) adapted the 1938 novel The Four of Hearts for the stage, although there is no evidence it was ever performed.

American playwright Joseph Goodrich adapted Calamity Town into a stage play, which he described as "Our Town with murder," in its New England setting and spare stage work. The play had its premiere at the Vertigo Theatre in Calgary, Alberta on January 23, 2016.

Awards and honors
The writing team of Ellery Queen received the following Edgar Awards from the Mystery Writers of America:
 1946: Best Radio Drama (tied with Mr and Mrs North)
 1950: Special Edgar Award for ten years' service through Ellery Queen's Mystery Magazine
 1961: Grand Master Edgar Award
 1969: Special Edgar Award on the 40th anniversary of the publication of The Roman Hat Mystery
 
They were also runners-up for the Edgar in the following categories
 1962: Best Short Story (Ellery Queen 1962 Anthology)
 1964: Best Novel (The Player on the Other Side)

The Mystery Writers of America established the Ellery Queen Award in 1983 "to honor writing teams and outstanding people in the mystery-publishing industry."

Ellery Queen was featured on a postage stamp issued by Nicaragua as part of a series of "Famous Fictional Detectives" to commemorate the 50th anniversary of Interpol in 1973 and a similar series of famous fictional detectives from San Marino in 1979.

Bibliography

Novels

By Dannay and Lee
(unless noted, all feature Ellery Queen and/or Inspector Richard Queen as characters.)

The Roman Hat Mystery—1929
The French Powder Mystery—1930
The Dutch Shoe Mystery—1931
The Greek Coffin Mystery—1932
The Egyptian Cross Mystery—1932
The American Gun Mystery—1933
The Siamese Twin Mystery—1933
The Chinese Orange Mystery—1934
The Spanish Cape Mystery—1935
The Lamp of God—1935†
Halfway House—1936
The Door Between—1937
The Devil to Pay—1938
The Four of Hearts—1938
The Dragon's Teeth AKA The Virgin Heiresses—1939
Calamity Town—1942
There Was an Old Woman AKA The Quick and the Dead—1943
The Murderer Is a Fox—1945
Ten Days' Wonder—1948
Cat of Many Tails—1949
Double, Double—1950
The Origin of Evil—1951
The King Is Dead—1952
The Scarlet Letters—1953
The Glass Village—1954 (neither Ellery Queen nor Inspector Queen in book)
Inspector Queen's Own Case—1956 (Inspector Queen only)
The Finishing Stroke—1958
The Player on The Other Side—1963 (ghost-written with Theodore Sturgeon)
And on the Eighth Day—1964 (ghost-written with Avram Davidson) (Grand Prix de Littérature Policière winner)
The Fourth Side of the Triangle—1965 (ghost-written with Avram Davidson)
A Study in Terror AKA Sherlock Holmes vs. Jack the Ripper in the UK—1966 (Movie tie-in or novelization of a movie of the same name about Sherlock Holmes and Jack the Ripper, with Ellery Queen added as a character in the framing story.  The Sherlock Holmes part was written by Paul W. Fairman with Dannay/Lee input.)
Face to Face—1967
The House of Brass—1968 (ghost-written with Avram Davidson) (A sequel to Inspector Queen's Own Case with a minimal appearance by Ellery.)
Cop Out—1969 (neither Ellery Queen nor Inspector Queen appear)
The Last Woman in His Life—1970
A Fine and Private Place—1971

† The Lamp of God is a long short story or a short novella, originally published in Detective Story magazine in 1935, first collected in The New Adventures of Ellery Queen (see below) and published separately (alone) as #23 in the Dell Ten-Cent Editions (64 pages) in 1951.

By other authors 
All ghostwriters are identified where known. Post-1961 novels are usually paperback originals.  All titles were edited and supervised by Lee except The Blue Movie Murders, which was edited and supervised by Dannay after Lee's death. Unless noted, these novels do not feature Ellery Queen as a character.

The Last Man Club (1941) A novelization of the radio play featuring Ellery Queen.
Ellery Queen, Master Detective (1941), aka The Vanishing Corpse, Pyramid, (1968) A novelization of the movie featuring Ellery Queen, which was loosely based on the novel The Door Between
The Penthouse Mystery (1941) A novelization of the movie (Ellery Queen's Penthouse Mystery) featuring Ellery Queen.
The Adventure of the Murdered Millionaire (1942) A novelization of the radio play featuring Ellery Queen.
The Perfect Crime (1942) A novelization of the movie (Ellery Queen and the Perfect Crime) featuring Ellery Queen, which in turn was loosely based on The Devil to Pay
Dead Man's Tale (1961) by Stephen Marlowe
Death Spins The Platter (1962) by Richard Deming
Wife Or Death (1963) by Richard Deming
Kill As Directed (1963) by Henry Kane
Murder With A Past (1963) by Talmage Powell
The Four Johns (1964) by John Holbrook Vance (Jack Vance)
Blow Hot, Blow Cold (1964) by Fletcher Flora
The Last Score (1964) by Charles W. Runyon
The Golden Goose (1964) by Fletcher Flora
A Room To Die In (1965) by John Holbrook Vance (Jack Vance)
The Killer Touch (1965) by Charles W. Runyon
Beware the Young Stranger (1965) by Talmage Powell
The Copper Frame (1965) by Richard Deming
Shoot the Scene (1966) by Richard Deming
The Madman Theory (1966) by John Holbrook Vance (Jack Vance)
Losers, Weepers (1966) by Richard Deming
Where Is Bianca? (1966) a Tim Corrigan novel by Talmage Powell
Why So Dead? (1966) a Tim Corrigan novel by Richard Deming
The Devil's Cook (1966) by Fletcher Flora
Which Way To Die? (1967) a Tim Corrigan novel by Richard Deming
Who Spies, Who Kills? (1967) a Tim Corrigan novel by Talmage Powell
How Goes The Murder? (1967) a Tim Corrigan novel by Richard Deming
Guess Who's Coming To Kill You? (1968) by Walt Sheldon
What's In The Dark? (1968) a Tim Corrigan novel by Richard Deming
Kiss And Kill (1969) by Charles W. Runyon
The Campus Murders (1969) a Mike McCall novel by Gil Brewer
The Black Hearts Murder (1970) a Mike McCall novel by Richard Deming
The Blue Movie Murders (1972) a Mike McCall novel by Edward Hoch

Juvenile novels as Ellery Queen, Jr. 
These novels were edited by Lee and ghosted by various authors, including Frank Belknap Long (who admitted writing two without mentioning the titles), Samuel Duff McCoy, and James Clark Carlisle, Jr., who "aroused the ire of Lee by farming out the writing of some of the books to a 'sub-ghost', which has made establishing authorship even worse".  All the "Junior" novels with a colour in their title starred Djuna (see Ellery Queen), the Queens' houseboy. The Mystery of the Merry Magician and The Mystery of the Vanished Victim starred "Gulliver Queen", Ellery's nephew.

The Black Dog Mystery – 1941 (ghosted by Samuel Duff McCoy)
The Golden Eagle Mystery – 1942
The Green Turtle Mystery – 1944
The Red Chipmunk Mystery – 1946 (ghosted by Samuel Duff McCoy)
The Brown Fox Mystery – 1948 (ghosted by Samuel Duff McCoy)
The White Elephant Mystery – 1950 (ghosted by Samuel Duff McCoy)
The Yellow Cat Mystery – 1952 (ghosted by Samuel Duff McCoy)
The Blue Herring Mystery – 1954 (ghosted by Samuel Duff McCoy)
The Mystery of the Merry Magician – 1954
The Mystery of the Vanished Victim – 1954
The Purple Bird Mystery – 1966

True crime
Two collections of true crime stories (based on material gathered by anonymous researchers) written by Lee alone, which were originally published in The American Weekly.

 Ellery Queen's International Case Book (1964)
 The Woman in the Case (1967)

Theatre
 Danger - Men Working (1936)

Short story collections
All written by Dannay and Lee.

The Adventures of Ellery Queen—1934
The New Adventures of Ellery Queen—1940 (Contains "The Lamp of God" —- see "Novels" above)
The Case Book of Ellery Queen—1945 (reprints five stories from the two previous collections, plus three scripts of radio dramas)
Calendar of Crime—1952
QBI: Queen's Bureau of Investigation—1955
Queens Full—1966
QED: Queen's Experiments In Detection—1968
The Best Of Ellery Queen—1985 (includes "Wedding Anniversary," otherwise uncollected, and a complete list of Ellery Queen short stories)
The Tragedy Of Errors—Crippen & Landru, 1999 (a previously unpublished synopsis of a Queen novel, written by Dannay, and all but one of the previously uncollected short stories)
The Adventure of the Murdered Moths and Other Radio Mysteries—Crippen & Landru, 2005

Other short story collections exist, such as More Adventures of Ellery Queen (1940), which reprint stories from two previous collections.

As Barnaby Ross

By Dannay and Lee 

The Tragedy Of X—1932
The Tragedy Of Y—1932
The Tragedy Of Z—1933
Drury Lane's Last Case—1933

By Don Tracy 

Quintin Chivas – 1961
The Scrolls of Lysis – 1962
The Duke of Chaos – 1962
The Cree from Minataree – 1964
Strange Kinship – 1965
The Passionate Queen – 1966

Omnibus volumes
The Ellery Queen Omnibus—1934
The Ellery Queen Omnibus—1936
Ellery Queen's Big Book—1938
Ellery Queen's Adventure Omnibus—1941
Ellery Queen's Mystery Parade—1944
The Case Book of Ellery Queen—1949
The Wrightsville Murders—1942
The Hollywood Murders—1957
The New York Murders—1958
The XYZ Murders—1961
The Bizarre Murders—1962

Critical works
The Detective Short Story: A Bibliography—1942
Queen's Quorum: A History of the Detective-Crime Short Story As Revealed by the 100 Most Important Books Published in this Field Since 1845—1951
In the Queen's Parlor, and Other Leaves from the Editor's Notebook—1957

Magazines
Mystery League—1933
Ellery Queen's Mystery Magazine—1941 onwards

Anthologies and collections
Challenge to the Reader—1938
101 Years' Entertainment, The Great Detective Stories, 1841–1941—1941
Sporting Blood: The Great Sports Detective Stories—1942
The Female of the Species: Great Women Detectives and Criminals—1943
The Misadventures of Sherlock Holmes—1944
The Best Stories from Ellery Queen's Mystery Magazine—1944
Dashiell Hammett: The Adventures of Sam Spade and Other Stories—1944
Rogues' Gallery: The Great Criminals of Modern Fiction—1945
To The Queen's Taste: The First Supplement to 101 Years' Entertainment, Consisting of the Best Stories Published in the First Five Years of Ellery Queen's Mystery Magazine—1946
The Queen's Awards, 1946—1946
Dashiell Hammett: The Continental Op—1945
Dashiell Hammett: The Return of the Continental Op—1945
Dashiell Hammett: Hammett Homicides—1946
Murder By Experts—1947
The Queen's Awards, 1947—1947
Dashiell Hammett: Dead Yellow Women—1947
Stuart Palmer: The Riddles of Hildegarde Withers—1947
John Dickson Carr: Dr. Fell, Detective, and Other Stories—1947
Roy Vickers: The Department of Dead Ends—1947
Margery Allingham: The Case Book of Mr. Campion—1947
20th Century Detective Stories—1948
The Queen's Awards, 1948—1948
Dashiell Hammett: Nightmare Town—1948
O. Henry: Cops and Robbers—1947
The Queen's Awards, 1949—1949
The Literature of Crime: Stories by World-Famous Authors—1950
The Queen's Awards, Fifth Series—1950
Dashiell Hammett: The Creeping Siamese—1950
Stuart Palmer: The Monkey Murder and Other Stories—1950
and many more

Notes

References

Further reading 
 Nevins, Francis M. Royal Bloodline: Ellery Queen, Author and Detective.  Bowling Green University Popular Press, 1974.   (cloth), 0-87972-067-0 (paperback).
 Nevins, Francis M. and Grams, Martin Jr.  The Sound of Detection: Ellery Queen's Adventures in Radio.  OTR Publishing, 2002.  .
 Goodrich, Joseph (Editor). "Blood Relations: The Selected Letters of Ellery Queen 1947-1950." Perfect Crime Books, 2012.  (paperback).

External links
 "Ellery Queen is the American detective story."
Ellery Queen radio shows in the public domain
Finding aid to Frederic Dannay papers at Columbia University. Rare Book & Manuscript Library.
Finding aid to Manfred Lee papers at Columbia University. Rare Book & Manuscript Library.
Ellery Queen Papers. Yale Collection of American Literature, Beinecke Rare Book and Manuscript Library.

 
American mystery writers
20th-century American novelists
House names
Edgar Award winners
Fictional amateur detectives
Fictional writers
Jewish novelists
Literary collaborations
American male novelists
Writing duos
20th-century American male writers